The Puerto Rico men's national 3x3 team represents Puerto Rico in international 3x3 basketball matches and is controlled by the Puerto Rican Basketball Federation (Federación de Baloncesto de Puerto Rico).

Competitions

World Cup record

See also

 Puerto Rican Basketball Federation
 Puerto Rico men's national basketball team
 Puerto Rico women's national basketball team

References

External links

3
Men's national 3x3 basketball teams